Ciudad Universitaria is a Sector in the city of Santo Domingo in the Distrito Nacional of the Dominican Republic. There are eighteen universities in Ciudad Universitaria in the city of Santo Domingo, the highest number of any city in the Dominican Republic. Established in 1538, Universidad Autónoma de Santo Domingo (UASD) is the oldest university in the Americas and is also the only public university in the city. Santo Domingo holds the nation's highest percentage of residents with a higher education degree.

Universidad Autonoma de Santo Domingo (UASD)
Universidad Adventista Dominicana (UNAD)
Universidad APEC (UNAPEC)
Instituto Tecnológico de Santo Domingo (INTEC)
Universidad del Caribe (UNICARIBE)
Universidad Iberoamericana (UNIBE) (UNIBE)
Universidad Católica Santo Domingo (UCSD)
Universidad de la Tercera Edad (UTE)
Universidad Tecnológica de Santiago (UTESA)
Universidad Nacional Pedro Henríquez Ureña (UNPHU)
Instituto de Ciencias Exactas (INCE)
Universidad Organización y Método (O&M)
Universidad Interamericana (UNICA)
Universidad Eugenio María de Hostos (UNIREMOS)
Universidad Francisco Henríquez y Carvajal (UFHEC)
Universidad Instituto Cultural Domínico Americano (UNICDA)
Pontificia Universidad Católica Madre y Maestra (PUCMM)
Instituto Tecnológico de las Americas (ITLA)
 Universidad Abierta para Adultos (UAPA)

Sources 
Distrito Nacional sectors 

Populated places in Santo Domingo
1538 establishments in the Spanish Empire